Aloe falcata is a species of flowering plant in the Asphodelaceae family.

See also

List of Aloe species

References

 Linn. Soc., Bot. 18: 181 1880.
 The Plant List entry

falcata
Taxa named by John Gilbert Baker